Philopotamis sulcatus is a species of a freshwater snail with an operculum, aquatic gastropod mollusk in the family Paludomidae.

Distribution
This species occurs in Sri Lanka.

References

 Subba Rao M.V. (1989). Handbook: freshwater molluscs of India. Zoological Survey of India, Calcutta. i-xxiii,1-289.

External links
 Reeve, L. A. (1847). Monograph of the genus Paludomus. In: Conchologia Iconica, or, illustrations of the shells of molluscous animals, vol. 4, pls. 1-3 and unpaginated text. L. Reeve & Co., London.
 Blanford, W. T. (1881). Contributions to Indian malacology, No. XII. Descriptions of new land and freshwater shells from Southern and Western India, Burmah, the Andaman Islands, &c. Journal of the Asiatic Society of Bengal. 49
 Brot, A. (1880). Die Gattung Paludomus auct. (Tanalia, Stomatodon, Philopotamis, Paludomus) (Melaniaceen). In: Systematisches Conchylien-Cabinet von Martini und Chemnitz, ed. 2, Bd 1, Abt. 25: 1-52, pls. 3-8. Nürnberg: Bauer & Raspe.

Paludomidae
Gastropods described in 1847